The Battle of the Saline River in August 1867 was one of the first recorded combats of the Buffalo Soldiers of the U.S. 10th Cavalry.  This battle occurred 25 miles northwest of Fort Hays in Kansas near the end of August 1867.[see discussion]

Prelude
On August 1, 1867, Cheyenne warriors under Tall Wolf, son of Medicine Arrows, attacked and killed a party of railroad workers in Ellis County, an incident which led to a battle between the Cheyenne and Buffalo Soldiers from Fort Hays that became known as "The Battle of the Saline River."

Battle
Captain George Augustus Armes, Company F, 10th Cavalry, while following an active "hostile indian" trail along the Saline River was surrounded by about 400 horse mounted Cheyenne warriors. Armes formed a defensive infantry style "hollow square" with the cavalry mounts in the middle. Seeking better defensive ground, Armes walked his command toward Fort Hays while maintaining the defensive square.  After 8 hours of combat, 2,000 rounds of defensive fire and 15 miles of movement, the Cheyenne disengaged and withdrew. Company F, without reinforcements, concluded 113 miles of movement during the 30-hour patrol, riding the final 10 miles back to Fort Hays with only one trooper killed in action. Captain Armes commented later, "It is the greatest wonder in the world that my command escaped being massacred." Armes credited his officers for a "... devotion to duty and coolness under fire."

Aftermath
Within a short time of violent clashes between Native Americans and whites, the last Indian battle in the State of Kansas took place on September 27, 1878. It was known as "The Battle of Punished Woman Fork" on Punished Woman Creek. Also known as the "Battle of Squaw's Den Cave." The Medicine Lodge Treaty would be signed, broken and betrayed. Other battles would continue such as the ones near Sterling, Colorado the Battle of Summit Springs and near Cheyenne, Oklahoma the Battle of Washita River after this, but the fighting along the Saline River was over.

See also
 Buffalo Soldiers
 List of battles fought in Kansas
 Military history of African Americans

References

Further reading
 Greene, Jerome A. (2004). Washita, The Southern Cheyenne and the U.S. Army. Campaigns and Commanders Series, vol. 3. Norman, OK: University of Oklahoma Press. .
 Schubert, Frank N. On the Trail of the Buffalo Soldier II: New and Revised Biographies of African Americans (1866–1917), Rowman & Littlefield, 2004. .
 Tom, Willard, Buffalo Soldiers. Tor/Forge, 1997.

External links
  Battle of Punished Woman Fork - Last Indian Battle in Kansas—1878, Keystone Gallery, Scott City, Kansas.
 Legends Of Kansas - History, Tales, and Destinations in the Land of Ahs - Battle of Punished Woman Fork, aka: Battle of Squaw's Den Cave (1878). Legends of Kansas, Warsaw, Missouri.

African American
Buffalo Soldiers
Comanche campaign
1867 in Kansas
August 1867 events